Grypothrix is a small genus of ferns in the family Thelypteridaceae.

Taxonomy
Grypothrix was previously sunk into Pronephrium but was restored as a full genus as a result of a phylogenetic study of the family Thelypteridaceae.

Species
, World Ferns accepted the following species:
Grypothrix acanthocarpum (Copel.) comb.ined.
Grypothrix crenulata (Holttum) S.E.Fawc. & A.R.Sm.
Grypothrix cuspidata (Blume) S.E.Fawc. & A.R.Sm.
Grypothrix longipetiolata (K.Iwats.) S.E.Fawc. & A.R.Sm.
Grypothrix megacuspis (Baker) S.E.Fawc. & A.R.Sm.
Grypothrix parishii (Bedd.) S.E.Fawc. & A.R.Sm.
Grypothrix pentapinnata (Fraser-Jenk.) S.E.Fawc. & A.R.Sm.
Grypothrix ramosii (Christ) S.E.Fawc. & A.R.Sm.
Grypothrix rubicunda (Alderw.) S.E.Fawc. & A.R.Sm.
Grypothrix salicifolia (Wall. ex Hook.) S.E.Fawc. & A.R.Sm.
Grypothrix simplex (Hook.) S.E.Fawc. & A.R.Sm.
Grypothrix sulawesiensis (K.Iwats.) S.E.Fawc. & A.R.Sm.
Grypothrix triphylla (Sw.) S.E.Fawc. & A.R.Sm.

Hybrid
Grypothrix × pseudoliukiuensis (Seriz.) comb.ined.

References

Thelypteridaceae
Fern genera